Mogens Schou (24 November 1918 – 29 September 2005) was a Danish psychiatrist whose research into lithium led to its utilization as a treatment for bipolar disorder.

Early years 
Schou was born in Copenhagen, Denmark, on 24 November 1918. His father was a psychiatrist and medical director of a large mental hospital. Schou chose to study medicine with a specific view to doing research on manic-depressive illness (now more commonly referred to as bipolar disorder). He graduated with a degree in medicine from the University of Copenhagen in 1944. After his training in clinical psychiatry he also studied experimental biology.

Research 
Schou's research interests focused on therapeutic uses of lithium for patients with mood disorders.

The psychopharmacological era began in earnest in 1949, with an article published by John Cade about the observed antimanic action of lithium in Australia. Intrigued by these findings Schou, who in the meantime had joined the Psychiatric Research Institute of Aarhus University, confirmed these findings in a double-blind placebo-controlled study with his co-workers.

During the early 1960s, G. P. Hartigan, Poul Chr. Baastrup and Schou independently made sporadic observations that were suggestive of lithium also having prophylactic properties in manic-depressive illness. Subsequently, Baastrup and Schou joined together and in a non-blind lithium trial saw their preliminary observations confirmed. They even deemed the results so significant that they concluded that ‘lithium is the first drug demonstrated as a clear-cut prophylactic agent against one of the major psychoses’.

However, the Schou-Baastrup prophylaxis hypothesis was met with great resistance by British psychiatry. To Aubrey Lewis and Michael Shepherd, lithium was ‘dangerous nonsense’. Shepherd, seconded by Harry Blackwell, simply characterized it as ‘a therapeutic myth’, which, in their opinion, was based on ‘serious methodological shortcomings’ and ‘spurious claims’. Even terms such as unethical and unscientific were used. After consideration of the ethical aspects invoked, Schou and Baastrup undertook a double-blind trial of prospective-discontinuation design and with random allocation of manic-depressive patients (already on lithium) to lithium or placebo. It confirmed their hypothesis, published in The Lancet in 1970.

He was aware of some of the limitations of lithium treatment. He welcomed the introduction of other prophylactic agents into the market. From the available observations he concluded, however, that anti-epileptics and atypical anti-psychotics act on different kinds of bipolar patients to lithium.

He was an author of more than 500 publications, including texts, research papers, articles and book chapters. He was Emeritus Professor of the Psychiatric Hospital in Risskov, Denmark.

Awards and honors 
Schou has published approximately 540 works on lithium and lithium therapy, and some of his awards include:

 1974—International Scientific Kitty Foundation Award (shared with Cade).
 1982—John Cade Memorial Award.
 1987—Albert Lasker Clinical Medical Research Award.
 1995—International Society of Lithium Research’s Mogens Schou Prize for Lifetime Achievement.
 2000—C.I.N.P’s Pioneers in Psychopharmacology Award.
 2001—International Society For Bipolars’ Mogens Schou Award For Distinguished Contributions.
 2004—NARSAD Lifetime Achievement Award.

He has received an honorary doctorate from Charles University in Prague. In recognition of his accomplishments in bipolar medicine, he was made the Honorary President of the International Society for Bipolar Disorders. At the same time, the Mogens Schou awards were created for presentation at the Society’s biennial International Conference on Bipolar Disorder.

References 
 
 
 Obituary Mogens Schou

1918 births
2005 deaths
Danish psychiatrists
People from Copenhagen
University of Copenhagen alumni
Bipolar disorder researchers
Recipients of the Lasker-DeBakey Clinical Medical Research Award